1 FL TV is Liechtenstein's first television broadcaster. It began operation on 15 August 2008 and broadcasts in German. Through cable networks, the channel is accessible to about 50,000 homes in Liechtenstein and a small portion of its neighboring Switzerland. Before the channel launched, people in Liechtenstein watched Austrian and Swiss TV channels instead.

History

On 15 August 2008, 1 FL TV began operation after being licensed by the Liechtenstein government under the leadership of businessman Peter Kölbel. It broadcasts in German and is a business venture led by Austrian businesswoman Beatrix Schartl after Kölbel's death.

On August 9, 2022, the managing director of 1 FL TV, Sandra Woldt, announced that the company would no longer seek EBU membership and participation in the Esc. Instead, they would concentrate on reporting in their own country.

Programming

Liechtenstein in the Eurovision Song Contest 
Liechtenstein showed interest in participating in the Eurovision Song Contest in 1969 and 1976. Despite this, it was not possible because at the time Liechtenstein did not have a television station based in that country. If 1 FL TV becomes an active member of the European Broadcasting Union, then Liechtenstein may have its national representation in Eurovision.

See also

 List of television stations in Europe

References

External links
  

German-language television stations
Liechtenstein culture
Telecommunications in Liechtenstein
Television channels and stations established in 2008
2008 establishments in Liechtenstein
Television in Liechtenstein